The men's 400 metres at the 2018 Commonwealth Games, as part of the athletics programme, took place in the Carrara Stadium between 8 and 10 April 2018.

Records
Prior to this competition, the existing world and Games records were as follows:

Schedule
The schedule was as follows:

All times are Australian Eastern Standard Time (UTC+10)

Results

First round
The first round consisted of six heats. The three fastest competitors per heat (plus six fastest losers) advanced to the semifinals.

Heat 1

Heat 2

Heat 3

Heat 4

Heat 5

Heat 6

Semifinals
Three semi-finals were held. The two fastest competitors per semi (plus two fastest losers) advanced to the final.

Semifinal 1

Semifinal 2

Semifinal 3

Final
The medals were determined in the final.

References

Men's 400 metres
2018